ID10T with Chris Hardwick (formerly The Nerdist Podcast) was a weekly interview show "about what it really means to be a nerd" hosted by Chris Hardwick. From its launch in 2010 until 2018, Jonah Ray and Matt Mira were usual co-hosts,  after which Hardwick hosted alone. , the most recent episode was published on 22 March 2022; no announcement has been made as to whether more will follow.

Format
The audio podcasts were typically an hour in length and include conversations with notable comedians or entertainers, sometimes at their own home. Guests typically relate to either stand-up comedy, geek and nerd culture, or both. Occasional "hostful" episodes featured solely Hardwick, Ray and Mira. , the most recent episode was published on 22 March 2022; no announcement has been made as to whether more will follow.

History
The show launched February 8, 2010. It served as the flagship podcast for Nerdist Industries, which was founded in 2012 after the success of The Nerdist Podcast. The show's theme song was "Hero of Time" by the analog synthesizer band Fartbarf. Prior to the February 2018 name change, the theme song was "Jetpack Blues, Sunset Hues" by Anamanaguchi.  

In 2012 Hardwick sold the Nerdiest brand to the Legendary Entertainment, but remained as chief director of Nerdiest. Hardwick's contract with Legendary Network ended at the end of 2017, and the podcast separated from Legendary-owned Nerdist Industries; in February 2018, the podcast was re-branded as ID10T with Chris Hardwick and moved to Cadence13. Hardwick changed the name after he moved it to become a part of his own ID10T merchandise and festival company. The podcast itself continued to operate under the same premise, with Hardwick, Mira, and Ray serving as hosts and Katie Levine serving as producer, although by this point other professional commitments had already meant Mira and Ray appeared increasingly infrequently on the show. The phrase ID10T is technical error code for a computer malfunction caused by the human user. 

The podcast went on a hiatus in June 2018 after Hardwick was accused of sexual assault and controlling behaviour by ex-partner Chloe Dykstra;  Hardwick denied the allegations. Following its return in November 2018,  Mira and Ray did not appear on the podcast.

Live recordings
The first live recording of the show was on April 5, 2010, at the Largo in Los Angeles, with guest Adam Savage of MythBusters, and has since been recorded live a number of other times.

In July 2011 the show was recorded live, at midnight, at the Montreal comedy festival Just for Laughs.

TV show
In 2011 the pilot and a Christmas Eve special aired, with Hardwick, Ray and Mira hosting. BBC America aired six more 'specials' throughout 2012. Beginning with episode 4 the show moved from a half-hour format to an hour.

A 10-episode second season aired in 2013.

Reception
The podcast was ranked #3 in Rolling Stones "The 10 Best Comedy Podcasts of the Moment", published April 6, 2011 and #7 in Rolling Stone's "The 10 Best Comedy Podcasts of the Moment", published May 8, 2014.

References

External links

Nerdist Industries
Comedy and humor podcasts
2011 American television series debuts
2013 American television series endings
2010 podcast debuts
Interview podcasts
Audio podcasts